The Samsung Galaxy Tab 4 10.1 is a 10.1-inch Android-based tablet computer produced and marketed by Samsung Electronics. It belongs to the fourth generation of the Samsung Galaxy Tab series, which also includes a 7-inch and an 8-inch model, the Galaxy Tab 4 7.0 and Galaxy Tab 4 8.0. It was announced on 1 April 2014, and released from 1 May 2014 along with the Samsung Galaxy Tab 4 8.0.

Features
Galaxy Tab 4 10.1 was released with Android 4.4.2 KitKat. Samsung customized the interface with its TouchWiz UX software. Some devices only run up to Android 5.0.2 as opposed to the 5.1.1 version. It also  has apps from Google, including Google Play, Gmail and YouTube, it has access to Samsung apps such as ChatON, S Suggest, S Voice, S Translator, S Planner, Smart Remote (Peel)(WiFi Version Only), Smart Stay, Multi-Window, Group Play, and All Share Play.

The device is available in WiFi-only, 3G &Wi-Fi, and 4G/LTE (carried by AT&T and Verizon) & WiFi variants. Storage ranges from 16 GB to 32 GB depending on the model, with a microSDXC card slot for expansion. It has a 10.1-inch WXGA TFT screen with a resolution of 1280x800 pixels. It also features a 1.3 MP front camera without flash and 3.0 MP AF rear-facing camera. It also has the ability to record HD videos. It has GPS and a GLONASS receiver.

References

Samsung Galaxy Tab series
Android (operating system) devices
Tablet computers introduced in 2014
Tablet computers